Extreme Championship Wrestling had held a variety of professional wrestling tournaments between 1992 and 2001 that were competed for by wrestlers that were a part of their roster.

Sporadic tournaments

ECW Tag Team Championship Tournament (1992)

The ECW Tag Team Championship Tournament was a four-team tournament created to crown the first-ever ECW Tag Team Champions on June 23, 1992.

ECW Television Championship Tournament (1993)
The ECW Television Championship Tournament was an eight-man tournament for the vacated ECW Television Championship on March 12, 1993. The former champion Glen Osbourne was stripped of the title, resulting in the title being decided in the tournament. The tournament aired on television between April 6 and April 20 episodes of Eastern Championship Wrestling.

ECW Tag Team Championship Tournament (1993)
The ECW Tag Team Championship Tournament was a tag team tournament to crown the new ECW Tag Team Champions on August 7 and August 8, 1993 after the titles were vacated when Chris Candido, one half of the champions with Johnny Hotbody left the company for Smoky Mountain Wrestling. The tournament aired on television between the August 17, 1993 and the September 7, 1993 episodes of Eastern Championship Wrestling.

The match ended in a double disqualification but still Koloffs advanced to the semi-finals.

NWA World Heavyweight Championship Tournament

The NWA World Heavyweight Championship Tournament was a single-elimination tournament held on August 27, 1994. The tournament was conducted for the vacant NWA World Heavyweight Championship. National Wrestling Alliance decided to crown its new champion in ECW as it was the biggest territory of NWA after World Championship Wrestling withdrew from the NWA in 1993.

ECW World Television Championship Tournament (2000)

The ECW World Television Championship Tournament was a single-elimination tournament for the vacated ECW World Television Championship after Rob Van Dam was stripped of the title by The Network due to his injury on March 4, 2000. The quarter-final matches took place on March 4, with one between Rhino and Spike Dudley airing on the March 10 episode of ECW on TNN. The semi-final and final matches took place at the Living Dangerously pay-per-view.

ECW World Tag Team Championship Tournament (2000)
The ECW World Tag Team Championship Tournament was a twelve-team tag team tournament for the vacant ECW World Tag Team Championship held on August 25, 2000. The titles were vacated when one half of the previous champions Justin Credible gave up the titles to challenge for the ECW World Heavyweight Championship at CyberSlam. The tournament matches aired on ECW on TNN and Hardcore TV. The tournament final was a three-way elimination match.

The final was a three-way elimination match.

References

Extreme Championship Wrestling
Professional wrestling tournaments
Professional wrestling-related lists